Chuqi Quta (Aymara chuqi gold, quta lake, "gold lake", Hispanicized spelling Choquecota) is a mountain in the Andes of Peru, about  high. It is located in the Puno Region, El Collao Province, Santa Rosa District. It lies southwest of Jisk'a Mawruma.

References

Mountains of Puno Region
Mountains of Peru